is a Japanese actor born in Tokyo. He has appeared in a number of feature films, television series, and stage productions. He is represented by Amuse, Inc. His wife is actress Nana Eikura.

Biography
He made his acting debut in films in 2007. In 2009, he had his first lead role in the film Giniro no Ame. In 2012, he starred in the television drama Clover. He played the hero, Hanako's brother Kichitaro Ando in the Asadora Hanako to Anne broadcast in the first half of 2014. He later played in the 2015 Taiga drama Hana Moyu as Shinsengumi Okita Sōji.

In April 2015, he was appointed a New Caledonia Tourism Goodwill Ambassador.

Kaku's career has took off from 2018 onwards, getting cast in leading roles for several series, resulted in his winning of the 2019 GQ Japan's Men of the Year Awards for Breakthrough Actor.

Private life
On 7 August 2016, he announced that he had married actress Nana Eikura whom he co-starred with in TV drama Testimony of N. They have two children.

Filmography

TV dramas

Film

Dubbing

Stage

Awards

References

External links
 
 
 
 

Japanese male television actors
Japanese male film actors
Japanese male stage actors
Male actors from Tokyo
1989 births
Living people
Amuse Inc. talents
21st-century Japanese singers
21st-century Japanese male singers